The House of Batthyány is the name of an ancient and distinguished Hungarian Magnate family. Members of this family bear the title Count/Countess (Graf/Gräfin) Batthyány von Német-Ujvar respectively, while the title of Prince (Fürst) von Batthyány-Strattmann is reserved only for the Head of the family. A branch of the family was notable in Croatia as well, producing several Bans (viceroys) of Croatia in the 16th,  17th and 18th century.

History
The Batthyány family can trace its roots to the founding of Hungary in 896 CE by Árpád. The family derives from a chieftain called Örs. Árpád had seven chieftains, one by the name of Örs, which later became Kővágó-Örs. In 1398 Miklós Kővágó-Örs married Katalin Battyány. King Zsigmond (Sigismund) gave Miklós the region around the town of Battyán (now called Szabadbattyán) and he took the name Batthyány (lit. "from Battyán"). The family were first mentioned in documents in 1398 and have had their ancestral seat in Güssing in the Austrian region of Burgenland since 1522.

In 1570, Boldizsár Batthyány transformed the seat of the family, Güssing, into the center of Protestantism in the region. His descendant Ádám Batthyány (1610–1659), however, was Catholic and founded a Franciscan monastery in Güssing. On 3.1.1764 Count Karl Josef Batthyány was created Prince of the Holy Roman Empire. As he didn't have surviving sons, his princely title was inherited by his nephew Count Adam Wenzel (1722-1787). Count Lajos Batthyány became the first Prime Minister of Hungary during the Hungarian Revolution of 1848 and was executed in Pest in 1849. After 1945 the Batthyány family's property was largely expropriated in Hungary and other countries under Communist rule, although they retained their property in Austria. The current family members have also strong ties to Hungary currently.

Modern era
Currently, the family has about 60 name bearers who live mainly in Austria, but also in Hungary, Germany, United States and South America. The current head of the family is Prince Laszlo Edmund Christof Maximilian Eugen Anton von Batthyány-Strattmann, son of Prince Laszlo Pascal von Batthyány-Strattmann (1938-2015) and his wife Veronika Hauschka von Treuenfels (b. 1942). Prince Laszlo lives with his wife and children in Austria. The family meets once a year for a so-called Familientag (family gathering) at their ancestral seat Güssing Castle.

Family members 
 Boldizsár Batthyány (1543–1590), baron, well-educated humanist, became Protestant in 1570, protector of the botanist Carolus Clusius

 Ádám Batthyány (1610–1659), count, Founder of the Franciscan monastery in Güssing
 Adam II. Batthyány (1662–1703), Ban of Croatia
 Lajos Batthyány (1696–1765), Hungarian Court Chancellor and Palatine of Hungary.
 Károly József Batthyány (1698–1772), Austrian field marshal and later educator of Joseph II, Ban (viceroy) of Croatia
 József Batthyány (1727–1799), bishop
 Ignác Batthyány (1741–1798), bishop and founder of the Batthyaneum Library, Alba Iulia, now Romania 
 Kázmér Batthyány (1807–1854), politician, minister in the Hungarian Revolution of 1848
 Franciska Batthyány (1802–1861), born Széchenyi
 Lajos Batthyány (1807–1849), executed, first Hungarian Prime Minister
 Count József Sándor Batthyány (1777–1812), his father
 Gusztáv, 5th Prince Batthyány-Strattmann (1803–1883), English sportsman, Thoroughbred racehorse owner/breeder
 Edmund Gustavus, 6th Prince Batthyany-Strattmann (1826–1914) 
 Ludovika Olga Karoline Philippine Antonia Batthyany  (1869–1939)
 Count Tivadar Batthyány (1859–1931)
 László, 7th Prince Batthyány-Strattmann (1870–1931), ophthalmologist, beatified in 2003
 Ervin Batthyány (1877–1945), anarchist and school reformer
 Countess Margit Batthyány (1911–1989) :de:Margit von Batthyány, lived until the end of World War II on Castle Rechnitz (Burgenland) where she was engaged in breeding horses and maintaining a reconvalescence home for members of the SS. Her involvement in the infamous Rechnitz massacre is still controversial.
 Sacha Battyhány Swiss journalist and writer, author of the book "A Crime in the Family" about the participation of Comtesse Margit Battyhány and other members of the family in the Rechnitz massacre

See also
List of titled noble families in the Kingdom of Hungary

References

External links 
 Family website
Archival material (ca. 212 running meters): The Batthyány Family Archive at the National Archives of Hungary [P (4545)]
Archival material (about 200 records): Batthyány Family Collection at the National Library of Israel (ARC. 4* 2031)
Shaul Greenstein, T he Hungarian Noble Family That Took in the Exiled Jews, The Librarians, Blog of the National Library of Israel, December 18, 2018

Hungarian noble families
Croatian noble families
Hungarian-language surnames